Maree Fitzgibbon (born 4 December 1966) is a former rugby union player. She made her Black Ferns debut on 22 July 1989 against the California Grizzlies at Christchurch. She competed at RugbyFest 1990 and at the 1991 Women's Rugby World Cup.

References 

1966 births
Living people
New Zealand women's international rugby union players
New Zealand female rugby union players
People from Leeston